Harper Peterson Jr. (born December 16, 1948) is a former Democratic member of the North Carolina State Senate, representing the 9th district. He was elected in the 2018 elections. Peterson formerly served as Mayor of Wilmington, North Carolina from 2001 to 2003, and on the Wilmington City Council from 1995 to 1999.

References

External links

Living people
1948 births
Democratic Party North Carolina state senators